Sankomota (originally named Uhuru) is a band formed in 1976 in Lesotho.  The band consisted of several members in its earliest years, namely: Frank Leepa (guitarist, vocalist, arranger, composer), Moss Nkofo (drummer), Black Jesus (percussion), Moruti Selate, Tsepo Tshola (lead vocalist and composer), and Pitso Sera (guitar), among others. Peter Schneider managed the band from its early years until 1979. Under the leadership of Leepa, Sankomota's career spanned more than two decades.

History
Frank Leepa - also known as The Captain - started the band in school, called Anti Antiques. The band later changed its name to Uhuru. However, due to the popularity of Black Uhuru from the Caribbean, they had to change their name again. When asked what Sankomota means, Frank Leepa said that it is the name of a mighty warrior from the Basotho and Bapedi people. Sankomota was the first band to record an LP in Lesotho. They were recorded by Lloyd Ross and Warrick Sony of Shifty Records on November 11, 1983. The album was self-titled "Sankomota" and it has nine tracks that are, collectively, under 50 minutes long.

Tsepo Tshola died on 15 July 2021.

Discography
 2021: Ngwana Moshangane
 2022: Piano For Kings 
 2022: Disatlo Bowa
 2023: Change Marobalo Ep
 2023: Pelo Yaka

References

 Born For Greatness, Biography of Frank Leepa

External links
 Peter Schneider
 

1976 establishments in Lesotho
Lesotho musicians